Aleurodamaeidae is a family of mites belonging to the order Sarcoptiformes.

Genera:
 Aleurodamaeus Grandjean, 1954 
 Austrodamaeus Balogh & Mahunka, 1981

References

Sarcoptiformes